Jordan Lee Clarke (born 19 November 1991) is an English professional footballer who plays for Oldham Athletic as a defender.

Club career
A former captain of the academy U16 side, Clarke made his professional debut for his hometown club as a substitute on 9 August 2009, in a 2–1 Football League Championship win against Ipswich Town. Three days later, he made his full debut against Hartlepool in the League Cup, playing 104 minutes. He was sent off after a controversial second yellow card in only his fourth league start in the away loss to Derby County on 6 November. On 9 December, he was injured and substituted in the first half during the 2–0 loss to Newcastle United at home. It was later confirmed that he will be out for around three months due to knee ligament damage. On 22 October 2010 he scored his first goal for the club in a 3–0 win against Barnsley at the Ricoh Arena. In March 2012 he scored his second goal for Coventry in a 2–2 draw away to Cardiff City.

On 1 July 2013, Coventry manager Steven Pressley confirmed that Jordan Clarke was one of 8 players surplus to requirements at the club. However, this decision was reversed a week later and Clarke was brought back into the first team squad. Since then Jordan Clarke has been primarily used as a centre-back at the club and put in a number of impressive performances to earn a new long-term contract.

On 29 October 2014, Clarke joined fellow League One side Yeovil Town on loan until 5 January 2015, in a deal which saw Aaron Martin move in the other direction.

On 10 January 2015, Clarke signed for League One side Scunthorpe United for an undisclosed fee agreeing a two-and-a-half-year deal.

On 7 December 2019 Clarke was allegedly racially abused by Forest Green Rovers fans.

Oldham Athletic
He was one of 17 players released by Scunthorpe at the end of the 2020–21 season.

Clarke signed to Oldham Athletic in June 2021.

International career
Clarke was called into the England under-19 squad for the friendly against Russia in September 2009. He played a large part in helping England advance to the elite qualification round for the 2010 European Championships.

Personal life
Clarke attended the Coundon Court School in Coundon, Coventry. He was in a relationship with Chloe Goodman.

Career statistics

References

External links
Jordan Clarke player profile at ccfc.co.uk

1991 births
English footballers
Association football defenders
Coventry City F.C. players
Yeovil Town F.C. players
Scunthorpe United F.C. players
Oldham Athletic A.F.C. players
Footballers from Coventry
Living people
English Football League players
England youth international footballers